Woodley Park is a neighborhood in Northwest, Washington, DC. It is bounded on the north by Woodley Road and Klingle Road, on the east by the National Zoo and Rock Creek Park, on the south by Calvert Street, on the southwest by Cleveland Avenue, and on the west by 34th Street.

Adjoining neighborhoods are Cleveland Park to the north, Mount Pleasant and Adams Morgan to the east, Kalorama to the south, Woodland-Normanstone Terrace to the southwest, and Massachusetts Heights to the west.

Woodley Park is served by the Woodley Park-Zoo/Adams Morgan Metro station, between Dupont Circle and Cleveland Park on the Red Line.

Straddling Connecticut Avenue south of the National Zoo is a neighborhood of fine early 20th-century row houses, a throwback to the days more than a century ago when developers hoped that this wide avenue that runs northward to the Maryland border would be a boulevard lined with elegant homes. Modern-day Connecticut Avenue north of the small Woodley Park historic district, however, is now mostly filled with high rent, high rise apartment houses — although the city's height limitation restricts them to no more than eight stories, they are considered high-rise by Washington standards. To the east, the neighborhood's curved streets overhang Rock Creek Park. On the west, they bend on the slope leading to the heights of Mt. Saint Albans, the site of Washington National Cathedral. The stately rows of meticulously designed houses are preserved intact, presenting streetscapes that have changed little for nearly a century. Though busy Connecticut Avenue is always just around the corner, the residential streets are leafy, green, and serene. The neighborhood provides access to several nature trails, including Rock Creek Park, Tregaron Conservancy, and Klingle Valley Trail.

On Connecticut Avenue, former row houses along the street have been converted into commercial properties, including restaurants, offices and retail shops. Two large hotels are located on Calvert Street (the Omni Shoreham Hotel) and Woodley Road (the Marriott Wardman Park hotel, the second largest hotel in D.C.). At night, the place is a hive of activity, particularly since a shuttle bus (The Circulator) now runs between the Metro stop (Woodley Park/Adams Morgan) to the heart of Adams Morgan and the U Street Corridor.  Shops and restaurants lining Connecticut Ave include many chains (such as Chipotle, McDonald's, and CVS), but also many fine local restaurants and shops.

The area was named after Woodley House, built by Philip Barton Key (the Uncle of Francis Scott Key) in 1801. Woodley has housed many political elites from President Grover Cleveland to World War II Secretary of War Henry Stimson. Nowadays Woodley House serves as the library and administrative building of the Maret School.

The Woodley Park Community Association was established to support the in-town neighborhood quality of life in Woodley Park.  It has several hundred members and works on issues of general neighborhood interest.

Education
The District of Columbia Public Schools is the public school system. Oyster Adams Bilingual School is the neighborhood K-8 school, formed in 2007 by the merger of James F. Oyster Bilingual Elementary School in Woodley Park and John Quincy Adams Elementary School in Adams Morgan.

Residents are zoned to Oyster Adams, and Jackson-Reed High School.

References

External links

 Woodley Park Community Association
 Why Is It Named Woodley Park?

Historic districts on the National Register of Historic Places in Washington, D.C.
Neighborhoods in Northwest (Washington, D.C.)